Platyptilia carduidactyla, the artichoke plume moth, is a moth of the family Pterophoridae described by Riley in 1869. It is found in New Zealand and North America, from Mexico north into the United States.

The wingspan is 19–32 mm. Adults are on wing in July in Mexico and from May to September further north.

The larvae feed on Arctium, Carduus, Cirsium, Cynara and Silybum species. They are a pest of Cynara scolymus. The females lay their eggs on the bottom side of artichoke plants. The caterpillars can cause considerable damage.

External links
University of California - Statewide Integrated Pest Management

carduidactyla
Moths of North America
Moths described in 1869